

The Arado SD II was a fighter biplane developed in Germany in the 1920s. Like the preceding SD I, it was intended to equip the clandestine air force that Germany was assembling at Lipetsk and was hoped to overcome the shortcomings of that type. Although it shared the same basic configuration, the SD II was an all-new design. A considerably larger and heavier aircraft, it had wings of less stagger, braced with conventional wires. The landing gear and tailplane were of far stronger construction.

The SD II was flown competitively against the Heinkel HD 37 in 1929 and was found to have highly undesirable handling characteristics. Development was terminated at that point.

Specifications

References

 
 World Aircraft Information Files. Brightstar Publishing, London. File 889 Sheet 74
 German Aircraft  between 1919 - 1945

Single-engined tractor aircraft
Biplanes
1920s German fighter aircraft
SD II